is a Japanese former backstroke swimmer who competed in the 1956 Summer Olympics.

References

External links
 

1935 births
Living people
Japanese male backstroke swimmers
Olympic swimmers of Japan
Swimmers at the 1956 Summer Olympics
World record setters in swimming
Asian Games medalists in swimming
Swimmers at the 1954 Asian Games
Swimmers at the 1958 Asian Games
Asian Games gold medalists for Japan
Medalists at the 1954 Asian Games
Medalists at the 1958 Asian Games
20th-century Japanese people